Nacholer Rani (Queen of Nachol) is a 2006 Bangladeshi film. It is based on the early 1950s Santhal people uprising in Nachol Upazila in Chapai Nawabganj District, East Bengal and the role of social activist and reformer Ila Mitra.  The film was the feature-length debut of director Syed Wahiduzzaman Diamond.

Plot summary
In 1950, Mitra took up the cause of the Santhals. She was married to Ramendra Nath Mitra, a Zamindar of Ramchandrapur in Nachol. She left her lavish life and fought for the ill-treated Santhals. She garnered recognition for her dedication to their cause. She was treated as an uncrowned queen by the Santhals. They gave her the title Rani Ma (Queen mother).

Production
Diamond was the costume designer and scriptwriter as well. Shahana Shumi played the role of Ila Mitra. Other actors were Kajol Majumder, Rabiul Islam, Afsana Rahman, Sajjad, Ripon, and Tapon. About 450 Santhals and 250 policemen performed in the film. Ivana and Anima De Costa were the playback singers.

The theatrical release of the film was on June 30, 2006 which was observed as the 150th anniversary of Santhal rebellion.

Reception
The film was screened in 10th Dhaka International Film Festival. Diamond was awarded Atandra Padak for his direction of this film and Gangajatra.

References

External links
 

2006 films
Bengali-language Bangladeshi films
Drama films based on actual events
Films set in 1950
2000s Bengali-language films